Edward Ayscough may refer to:
Edward Ayscu (1550–?), or Ayscough (1550–1616), English historian
Edward Ayscough (of Nuthall) (c. 1590–after 1641), MP for Stamford 1624
Sir Edward Ayscough (born 1596) (1596–by 1654), English MP for Lincoln and Lincolnshire
Sir Edward Ayscough (died 1668) (c. 1618–1668), English MP for Great Grimsby 1659
Sir Edward Ayscough (died 1699) (1650–1699), English MP for Great Grimsby 1685–1699